Tolson is a surname. Notable people with the surname include:

Aaron Tolson, American tap dancer
Chick Tolson (1898–1965), American baseball player
Clyde Tolson (1900–1975), American Associate Director of the FBI
Dean Tolson (born 1951), American basketball player
Dickon Tolson, British actor
Edgar Tolson (1904–1984), American woodcarver
Jim Tolson, Scottish politician
Joe P. Tolson (1941–2019), American politician
John Tolson (academic) (died 1644), English academic administrator at the University of Oxford
Max Tolson (born 1945), Australian football (soccer) forward
Melvin B. Tolson (1900–1966), American writer
Neil Tolson (born 1973), English footballer
Randall Tolson (1912–1954), American clockmaker